Frank A. Garcia is an American paleontologist who discovered more than 30 prehistoric species.

Biography
Garcia was born in New York, New York. He attributes his interest in dinosaurs to going a library in west Tampa, Florida, and opening up a book about dinosaurs when he eight-years old. He graduated from Thomas Jefferson High School in Tampa, Florida in 1964.

In 1979, Garcia worked as chief investigator for the Smithsonian Institution, collecting prehistoric sea cows, whales, and dolphins.
In June 1983, Garcia discovered of one of biggest fossil finds in North America. Later, fossil experts described it to be one of the most significant paleontological finds discovering 1.5 million year old prehistoric graveyard of what was once a bed of a prehistoric river that had attracted a wide range of animals.

During his fossil hunting career in Florida, Garcia discovered more than 30 previously unknown species of prehistoric creatures.

"Pursuing the wonder of discovery" is an apt tagline for Frank A. Garcia. Despite having no formal education, Mr. Garcia has become one of America’s foremost paleontologists, discovering more than 30 previously unknown species (including two which were named after him). He slid down into phosphate pits with a broken leg, dug up massive prehistoric turtle bones with his dog Webster, and even went digging while recovering from back surgery.

Personal life
Garcia retired from fossil hunting in Florida to move to Black Hills where he still hunts for fossils. He is a frequent collaborator with Peter Larson and Robert T. Bakker.

See also
Dinosaur renaissance
Physiology of dinosaurs

References

American paleontologists
20th-century American male writers
Living people
American non-fiction writers
Year of birth missing (living people)
20th-century American writers
Male non-fiction writers